Ally Ryan is an American singer-songwriter based in Los Angeles. She gained recognition for having written Kat Deluna's single "Waves" which peaked at number one in Japan. Her debut single "Wasted" has been successful, charting on multiple Billboard charts.

Early life and career
At the age of three, 
her first microphone and started writing songs at the age of thirteen. She began her career as a songwriter, writing songs for artists.

She described the inspiration behind her debut single "Waves" as a "toxic relationship" she was in, and the song as 'catchy, fun and relatable'. She told Digital Journal: "It is about a love that is so intense that it becomes toxic." In August 2017, she released an acoustic version and a month later, a remixes EP of the song. A music video for the song was also published.

Discography

Singles

As lead artist

References

Musicians from Los Angeles
Living people
American women pop singers
Year of birth missing (living people)
21st-century American women